Matthew Vincent O'Malley (June 26, 1878 - May 26, 1931) was an American businessman and politician who was elected to serve as a U.S. Representative from New York in 1930. He died in 1931, shortly after winning election, but before formally taking his seat.

Early life and education 
Matthew V. O'Malley was born in Brooklyn, New York, on June 26, 1878.  He attended both parochial and public schools in Brooklyn, and worked as secretary to Brooklyn's public health officer.

Career 
O'Malley later became involved in the real estate, insurance and surety bond businesses, and was active in civic and business organizations including the Brooklyn Chamber of Commerce.

Election to Congress 
In November 1930 Congressman John Quayle of New York's 7th congressional district died shortly after winning reelection to a fifth term, which was scheduled to begin on March 4, 1931.  O'Malley ran as a Democrat and won the February 1931 special election held to select Quayle's replacement.

Death 
O'Malley died at his Brooklyn home on May 26, 1931.  Because Congress was not in session at the time of his death, O'Malley never took his oath of office or exercised any of the duties of a Congressman. He was, nevertheless, serving in office from the beginning of his term on March 4, 1931.  In 1932 Congress voted to pay the salaries of several deceased House members to their next of kin.  O'Malley was included, and his mother received $10,000.

He was buried in Brooklyn's Holy Cross Cemetery.

See also
 List of members-elect of the United States House of Representatives who never took their seats

References

External links

1878 births
1931 deaths
Democratic Party members of the United States House of Representatives from New York (state)
Elected officials who died without taking their seats
Politicians from Brooklyn